PBB as a three-letter abbreviation may refer to:

 Parallel Building Blocks, an Intel multicore programming product
 Partai Bulan Bintang or Crescent Star Party, an Indonesian political party
 Parti Pesaka Bumiputera Bersatu, a Malaysian political party
 Passenger boarding bridge or jet bridge, a connector that extends from an airport terminal gate to an airplane
 Pauls und Braunes Beiträge or Beiträge zur Geschichte der deutschen Sprache und Literatur (Contributions to the History of the German Language and Literature), an academic journal
 Philippine Business Bank
 Pinoy Big Brother, the Philippine version of the reality television show Big Brother
 Polybrominated biphenyl, a group of manufactured chemicals
 Provider Backbone Bridges or IEEE 802.1ah-2008, a set of network routing protocols
 Public Bank Berhad, one of bank perdagangan in Malaysia
 Perserikatan Bangsa-Bangsa, Indonesian abbreviation for United Nations